Westralichthys is an extinct monospecific genus of dunkleosteoid from the Late Devonian: Middle Famennian stage from Western Australia.

Phylogeny
Westralichthys belongs to the superfamily Dunkleosteoidea, related to the giant Dunkleosteus. The phylogeny of Westralichthys can be shown in the cladogram below:

References

Arthrodires